Alice Cary Risley (November 1, 1847-1939) of Columbia, Missouri, was a nurse during the American Civil War. She was the last surviving member of the National Association of Civil War Nurses. Her mother, Phoebe Farmer, was a cousin of Alice and Phoebe Cary.

Biography 
Born Alice Cary Farmer on November 1, 1847 in Wilmington, Ohio. Her father, Franklin Farmer, had been forced to leave their family home in New Iberia, Louisiana when the war broke out due to their politics.

Her father joined the Union Army and the family moved to New Orleans, following the underground railroad. She began service as a nurse in New Orleans at about the age of 15.

In 1874, in St. Louis, Missouri, Alice married Samuel A. Risley, a former Union soldier whom she had nursed. He founded the Southern Missouri Journal. Later Risley and her husband served together as postmaster and postmistress of Howell County, Missouri.

Risley was the last surviving member of the National Association of Civil War Nurses, which dissolved on her death.

She is mentioned in the St. Louis Globe-Democrat of July 27, 1930. She was president of the National Association of Army Nurses of the Civil War. She died in 1939 at the home of her son, Guy, in Alexandria, Louisiana.

References 

1847 births
1939 deaths
People from Wilmington, Ohio
American Civil War nurses
American women nurses